National Centre for Statistics and Information is a government agency in Oman. It was established in 2012 in accordance to the Supreme Council for Planning. It is responsible for the development and sustainability of Oman economy. The National Centre for Statistics and Information's vision is to make available statistics for Sultanate of Oman.

References 

Government agencies established in 2012
Government agencies of Oman